Kim Seong-hyeon could refer to:

 Kim Seong-hyeon (golfer) (born 1998), South Korean golfer
 Kim Sung-hyun (baseball, born 1987), South Korean baseball player
 Kim Seong-hyun (born 1989), South Korean baseball player
 Kim Sung-hyun, known as Andrew Kim, Korean-American intelligence official
 Kim Sung-hyun (born 1993), South Korean footballer